The New Mexico whiptail (Aspidoscelis neomexicanus) is a female-only species of lizard found in the southwestern United States in New Mexico and Arizona, and in northern Mexico in Chihuahua. It is the official state reptile of New Mexico. It is one of many lizard species known to be parthenogenetic. Individuals of the species can be created either through the hybridization of the little striped whiptail (A. inornatus) and the western whiptail (A. tigris), or through the parthenogenetic reproduction of an adult New Mexico whiptail.

The hybridization of these species prevents healthy males from forming, whereas males exist in both parent species (see Sexual differentiation). Parthenogenesis allows the resulting all-female population to reproduce and thus evolve into a unique species capable of reproduction. This combination of interspecific hybridization and parthenogenesis exists as a reproductive strategy in several species of whiptail lizard within the genus Aspidoscelis to which the New Mexico whiptail belongs.

Description 
Light colored spots often occur between the stripes. They have a white or pale blue underside, with a blue or blue-green colored throat. They are slender bodied, with a long tail that is more commonly blue-green in their infant stage, melding into the same spotted brown and yellow color as they age.

Behavior 
Like most other whiptail lizards, the New Mexico whiptail is diurnal and insectivorous. They are wary, energetic, and fast moving, darting for cover if approached. They are found in a wide variety of semi-arid habitats, including grassland, rocky areas, shrubland, or mountainside woodlands. Reproduction occurs through parthenogenesis, with up to four unfertilized eggs being laid in mid summer, and hatching approximately eight weeks later.

The New Mexico whiptail lizard is a crossbreed of a western whiptail, which lives in the desert, and the little striped whiptail, which favors grasslands. The whiptail engages in mating behavior with other females of its own species, giving rise to the common nickname "lesbian lizards". A common theory is that this behavior stimulates ovulation, as those that do not "mate" do not lay eggs.

See also
 New Mexico
 Whiptail

Footnotes

References

 Herps of Texas: Cnemidophorus neomexicanus

Aspidoscelis
Lizards of North America
Reptiles described in 1852
Biota of New Mexico
Endemic fauna of Arizona
Endemic fauna of New Mexico
Reptiles of the United States
Symbols of New Mexico
Taxa named by Charles Herbert Lowe
Taxa named by Richard G. Zweifel
Vertebrate parthenogenesis
Unisexual animals